Al Overton (May 20, 1912 – August 1, 1985) was an American sound engineer. He was nominated for an Academy Award in the category Best Sound for the film Diamonds Are Forever. He worked on more than 90 films between 1954 and 1975. His son, Al Overton Jr., was later nominated for four Academy Awards for Best Sound.

Selected filmography
 Diamonds Are Forever (1971)

References

External links

1912 births
1985 deaths
American audio engineers
People from Connecticut
20th-century American engineers